Si loin et si proche (lit. So distant and so close) is a one-shot slice of life fantasy manhua written and illustrated by Zhang Xiaobai. It was published in French by Kana on 5 March 2010.

Reception
It won the Gold Award at the 4th International Manga Award in 2011. Planetebd.com's Faustine Lillaz gave the manhua a rating of 3 out of 4.  Manga Sanctuary's Den d Ice gave it 3.5 out of 5 stars.

References

Fantasy comics
Manhua titles
2010 comics debuts
International Manga Award winners
One-shot comic titles
Slice of life comics